Aodhán Madden (1947-2015) was an Irish playwright, screen writer, poet and short story writer.

Life
Aodhán Madden was born in Dublin in 1947.  He initially worked as a journalist and critic with the Irish Press. He then began writing full-time for stage, radio and screen. His plays were staged at the Abbey Theatre and the Peacock Theatre and broadcast on RTE and the BBC. Madden also wrote the acclaimed film Night Train, which starred John Hurt and Brenda Blethyn. He taught in the Media Department in Coláiste Dhúlaigh College of Further Education in Coolock in his later life for several years.

He died in 2015.

Works

Stage plays
 The Midnight Door (1983)
 The Dosshouse Waltz (1985)
 Sensations (1986)
 Private Death of a Queen (1986)
 Sea Urchins (1988)
 Remember Mauritania (1987)
 Josephine in the Night (1988)
 Candlemas Night (1991).

Radio plays
 Remember Mauritania (RTÉ, 1985) 
 Obituaries (RTÉ, 1992)

Screenplay
 Night Train (1998)

Short stories
 Mad Angels of Paxenau Street (1991)

Poetry
 Demons (1978)

Memoir
 Fear and Loathing in Dublin (2009). Dublin: Liberties Press.

Awards
 Member, Aosdána
 1984: O.Z. Whitehead award for drama - for Remember Mauritania 
 1985: O.Z. Whitehead award for drama - for Private Death of a Queen 
 1985: Herald Tribune Award for Best Play in the Dublin Theatre Festival - for Dosshouse Waltz
 1998: screenplay Night Train (1998), directed by John Lynch, won the best actor award for Sir John Hurt at the Verona Film Festival in 1999 and was nominated as best European feature at the Brussels Film Festival.
 Francis MacManus Award

See also
 List of Irish writers

References

1947 births
2015 deaths
Aosdána members
Irish male dramatists and playwrights
20th-century Irish male writers
21st-century Irish male writers
Irish male short story writers
Irish male poets
Writers from Dublin (city)
20th-century Irish dramatists and playwrights
20th-century Irish poets
20th-century Irish short story writers
21st-century Irish dramatists and playwrights
21st-century Irish short story writers
21st-century Irish poets